Ōtoba Station may refer to:
 Ōtoba Station (Fukui), a railway station in Fukui Prefecture, Japan
 Ōtoba Station (Gifu), a railway station in Gifu Prefecture, Japan